Theatre in the Square is an American professional theatre in Cobb County, Georgia.

In July 2015, a new theater group billed as “Marietta’s New Theatre in the Square" rented the space formerly used by Theatre in the Square.

References

External link
Theatre in the Square Collection, 1982-2012, from the Kennesaw State University Archives.

Theatre in Georgia (U.S. state)
Tourist attractions in Cobb County, Georgia
Buildings and structures in Marietta, Georgia